Aris Thessaloniki competes in the Greek topflight. They started their Greek campaign after finishing ninth in last season's league and will enter the Greek Football Cup in the fourth round.

After many financial difficulties during the past season, a new chairman, Antonis Zambetas, was elected by the Aris Members' Society. The new Board of directors announced a 78% budget cut and most of the players including Nery Castillo, Michalis Sifakis, Ricardo Faty, Neto were released. Under manager Makis Katsavakis, Aris will largely depend on players from the club's youth team and free agents.

First-team squad

Transfers and loans

Transfers in

Transfers out

Loans in

Friendly matches

Competitions

Overall

Overview

{| class="wikitable" style="text-align: center"
|-
!rowspan=2|Competition
!colspan=8|Record
|-
!
!
!
!
!
!
!
!
|-
| Super League

|-
| Greek Cup

|-
! Total

Super League

League table

Results summary

Results by round

Matches

Greek Football Cup

Round of 32

Player statistics

Appearances

Goals

Kit

|
|
|
|
|

References

External links
 Aris Thessaloniki F.C. official website
 Aris Thessaloniki FC on Superleaguegreece.net

2012-13
Greek football clubs 2012–13 season